Anita Görbicz (born 13 May 1983) is a Hungarian former handballer who played for Győri ETO KC and the Hungary national team. She is widely regarded as one of the best handball players of all time, and was voted IHF World Player of the Year in 2005 by the International Handball Federation. Görbicz has also been given the nickname the Queen of Handball internationally.

She is married; her husband is Ottó Vincze, a Hungarian former football player. They have two sons, Boldizsár, born in 2015 and Domonkos, born in 2022.

She is the Honorary Citizen of Győr.

Career

Club
Anita Görbicz started her career at Hungarian club Győri ETO KC in 1993, aged 10. She has become a key member of the team   and her absence is considered a notable disadvantage. With ETO, Görbicz has won the Hungarian Championship and Cup several times. At European level, she has reached the finals of the Cup Winners' Cup and EHF Cup.

Győri ETO reached the final stage of the Champions League for the first time in 2009. Due to a knee injury a few days before the matches, Görbicz missed the finals where the Győr side lost against Danish champion Viborg HK. In spite of this, she ranked second in the tournament's top goalscorers list.

Anita scored her 2000th goal in the Hungarian Championship in January 2018.

She has won the EHF Champions League trophy five times.

International
Görbicz participated in the 2003 World Championship where Hungary lost the final match against France. She received a bronze medal at the 2004 European Championship. In Russia 2005 she won bronze with her team.

Anita Görbicz has seen her performance with the national team officially recognized several times. She has been a member of the World Championship All-Star Team three times in a row: 2003, 2005 and 2007. She was also among the tournament top goalscorers in 2005 (ranked third) and 2007 (ranked second).

She was part of the Hungarian team at the 2004 Summer Olympic Games in Athens, and again at the 2008 Olympic Games in Beijing. In 2004 the Hungarian team placed fifth, after losing to the French team in the quarterfinals, and beating Brazil and Spain in the placement matches. At the 2008 Olympic Games Hungary placed fourth, after beating Romania in the quarterfinals and qualifying for the semifinals, losing to Russia in the semi, and then losing to South Korea in the bronze final. Görbicz scored 49 goals at the 2008 Olympics,  second only to Romania's Ramona Maier.

Anita announced her retirement from the national team on 10 December 2017 after Hungary failed to qualify to the quarter-finals of the 2017 World Women's Handball Championship.

Personal life
Her first husband was András Présing. They married in 2006, and divorced after 17 months. Anita is married to former football player Ottó Vincze. She gave birth to their son, Boldizsár in June 2015. It was announced on 13 June 2022 that she's expecting her second child, Domonkos who was born in October 2022.

Achievements

Nemzeti Bajnokság I:
Winner (13): 2005, 2006, 2008, 2009, 2010, 2011, 2012, 2013, 2014, 2016, 2017, 2018, 2019
Silver Medalist: 2000, 2004, 2007, 2015
Bronze Medalist: 1999, 2001, 2002, 2003
Magyar Kupa:
Winner (15): 2005, 2006, 2007, 2008, 2009, 2010, 2011, 2012, 2013, 2014, 2015, 2016, 2018, 2019, 2021
Finalist: 2000, 2002, 2004, 2017
EHF Champions League:
Winner (5): 2013, 2014, 2017, 2018, 2019
Finalist: 2009, 2012, 2016
Semifinalist: 2007, 2008, 2010, 2011, 2021
EHF Cup Winners' Cup:
Finalist: 2006
Semifinalist: 2003
EHF Cup:
Finalist: 2002, 2004, 2005
Junior World Championship:
Silver Medalist: 2001
World Championship:
Silver Medalist: 2003
Bronze Medalist: 2005
European Championship:
Bronze Medalist: 2004, 2012

Individual awards
 IHF World Player of the Year: 2005
 Hungarian Handballer of the Year: 2005, 2006, 2007, 2013, 2014, 2017
 Nemzeti Bajnokság I Top Scorer: 2008
 All-Star Playmaker of the World Championship: 2003, 2005, 2007, 2013
 Prima Award: 2009
 EHF Champions League Top Scorer: 2012, 2014
 Carpathian Trophy Top Scorer: 2012, 2016
 All Star Team of the EHF Champions League: 2014
 EHF Female Player of the Month: May 2017, June 2017, April 2018

References

External links

Anita Görbicz player profile on Győri Audi ETO KC Official Website
Anita Görbicz career statistics at Worldhandball

1983 births
Living people
People from Veszprém
Hungarian female handball players
Handball players at the 2004 Summer Olympics
Handball players at the 2008 Summer Olympics
Olympic handball players of Hungary
Győri Audi ETO KC players
Association footballers' wives and girlfriends
Sportspeople from Veszprém County